The Dwight Yorke Stadium, located in Bacolet, Scarborough, Tobago, (Trinidad and Tobago), is named after former Aston Villa, Manchester United, Blackburn Rovers, Birmingham City, Sydney, Sunderland and Trinidad and Tobago footballer Dwight Yorke. The stadium was constructed for the 2001 FIFA U-17 World Championship which was hosted by Trinidad and Tobago. The Dwight Yorke Stadium has a capacity of 7,500, it is located on the Island of Tobago, only one minute from the capital Scarborough and 25 minutes from the airport. The stadium is used by the local football team and the playing surface dimension is 105 metres x 68 metres.

The stadium hosted the 2005 Carifta Track and Field Championships and is also used for minor Tobagonian athletics events.

It also hosted games from the 2010 FIFA U-17 Women's World Cup.

References 

Football venues in Trinidad and Tobago
Tobago
Sports venues completed in 2001
2001 establishments in Trinidad and Tobago
Athletics (track and field) venues in Trinidad and Tobago